Jennie Simpson may refer to:
 Jennie Simpson (camogie)
 Jennie Simpson (bowls)

See also
 Jenny Simpson (disambiguation)